Veerullapadu mandal is one of the 20 mandals in the NTR district of the Indian state of Andhra Pradesh.

References 

Mandals in NTR district